The 1938 Wellington City mayoral election was part of the New Zealand local elections held that same year. In 1938, elections were held for the Mayor of Wellington plus other local government positions including fifteen city councillors. The polling was conducted using the standard first-past-the-post electoral method.

The contest resulted in the re-election of incumbent Thomas Hislop who defeated his only competitor Charles Chapman of the Labour Party. Chapman had unsuccessfully run for Mayor three times prior, in 1915, 1925 and 1927. He also stood as a councillor and was successful.

Mayoralty results

Councillor results

References

Mayoral elections in Wellington
1938 elections in New Zealand
Politics of the Wellington Region
1930s in Wellington